The Memphis Space Center was a non-profit educational organization founded in 1992 in Memphis, Tennessee.  The ultimate goal of the group was to establish a Challenger Learning Center within the city. According to The Commercial Appeal, the MSC raised approximately $725,000 in commitments towards the Challenger Center designation. Negotiations to bring the Challenger Learning Center to Christian Brothers University fell apart in July 1998.

Officers

 Executive Director - Dr. James H. Erickson
 Director of Operations - William W. Wood
 Director of Curriculum - Cynthia Miller
 President - Richard A. Leemis

Notable Events

 Eclipse Fair - The MSC organized an "eclipse fair" to watch the Solar eclipse of May 10, 1994. Approximately 5,000 children gathered to watch the eclipse at Halle Stadium in East Memphis. 
 Apollo 11 Anniversary - On July 16, 1994, The MSC held a model rocket launch event to commemorate the 25th anniversary of the 1969 Apollo 11 launch. The event took place at Christian Brothers University as part of The MSC's "Memphis Space Day."

Space Camp

The MSC was best known for its summer Space Camp which was inspired from the programs in Huntsville, Alabama. The day camps were held on the campus of Christian Brothers University. Activities for campers included model rocketry, making a comet, learning about toys in space, simulating a Mars launch, and scaling out a model of the solar system.

References 

Organizations based in Memphis, Tennessee
1992 establishments in Tennessee
Educational institutions established in 1992